Maly Naryn (Baga Narin) is a rural locality (an ulus) in Dzhidinsky District, Republic of Buryatia, Russia. The population was 238 as of 2010. There are 3 streets.

Geography 
Maly Naryn is located 16 km southeast of Petropavlovka (the district's administrative centre) by road. Gegetuy is the nearest rural locality.

References 

Rural localities in Dzhidinsky District